This article lists events that occurred during 1979 in Estonia.

Incumbents

Events
Baltic Appeal was revealed.
Karula Landscape Protection Area (nowadays Karula National Park) was established.

Births
6 November – Gerli Padar, Estonian  singer and TV host

Deaths

References

 
1970s in Estonia
Estonia
Estonia
Years of the 20th century in Estonia